The Aichi Experimental Type 15-Ko Reconnaissance Seaplane (Mi-go) was a prototype reconnaissance seaplane built by Aichi in the mid-1920s.

Design and development
The Mi-Go was built in response to an Imperial Japanese Navy requirement for a reconnaissance seaplane to replace the Hansa-Brandenburg W.33 in IJN service. The W.33 had been acquired by the IJN in 1922, but was unpopular with crews due to poor handling and limited visibility afloat. The Mi-Go differed from the W.33 in having floats connected to the wings, a wooden airframe, fabric covered wings, and much lighter weight. Four prototypes of the Mi-Go were built; tests of which showed it to be longitudinally unstable in flight, although the first prototype used Dornier bench-type aileron balances, and the IJN selected the rival Nakajima Type 15 Reconnaissance Seaplane (E2N) for production instead.

Operators

Imperial Japanese Navy

Specifications

References

Type 15, Aichi
Type 15
Sesquiplanes
Single-engined tractor aircraft
Aircraft first flown in 1925